Brian Wong (born February 3, 1989) is an American professional stock car racing driver. He last competed part-time in the NASCAR Camping World Truck Series and the ARCA Racing Series.

Racing career

NASCAR Camping World Truck Series
Wong began his Truck Series career in 2015, driving the No. 25 Toyota Tundra for Venturini Motorsports at Bowmanville. He finished 12th, and this was his only race for the season.

Wong returned to the Truck Series in 2017, driving the No. 99 Chevrolet Silverado for MDM Motorsports. He again competed in the Bowmanville race and finished 12th.

NASCAR K&N Pro Series West
Wong’s NASCAR career first began in the K&N West Series in 2008, where he drove the No. 89 Chevrolet for his own team, Speed Wong Racing, in four races. Wong has competed 6 years in the West Series, with a best ranking in points standings of 20th in 2009.

NASCAR K&N Pro Series East
Wong participated in two races in the East Series, one each in 2009 and 2015. In 2009, he drove the No. 89 Dodge and in 2015, he drove the No. 40 Chevrolet.

ARCA Racing Series
Wong has run one race each in 2013, 2014, 2015, and 2017 in the ARCA Racing Series. Three of the races were at Millville, and the last was at Road America.

Motorsports career results

NASCAR
(key) (Bold – Pole position awarded by qualifying time. Italics – Pole position earned by points standings or practice time. * – Most laps led.)

Camping World Truck Series

K&N Pro Series East

K&N Pro Series West

ARCA Racing Series
(key) (Bold – Pole position awarded by qualifying time. Italics – Pole position earned by points standings or practice time. * – Most laps led.)

References

External links
 

Living people
1989 births
NASCAR drivers
Racing drivers from California
ARCA Menards Series drivers